The canton of Illkirch-Graffenstaden is an administrative division of the Bas-Rhin department, northeastern France. Its borders were modified at the French canton reorganisation which came into effect in March 2015. Its seat is in Illkirch-Graffenstaden.

It consists of the following communes:
Eschau
Illkirch-Graffenstaden
Ostwald
Plobsheim

References

Cantons of Bas-Rhin